Kody S. Vanderwal (born January 19, 2001) is an American professional stock car racing driver. He last competed part-time in the NASCAR Xfinity Series, driving the No. 52 Chevrolet Camaro for Jimmy Means Racing.

Racing career

Vanderwal's racing career began at the age of 11 at a local dirt track in Fort Morgan, Colorado, where he drove an "Enduro" stock car for several years.
Vanderwal started racing Pure Stocks at Colorado National Speedway in 2015 and later went on to run Super Stocks, Pro-Trucks, and Super Late Models.
In 2017, Vanderwal was offered a ride in the NASCAR K&N Pro Series West. He ran a full season, earning two top fives and would go on to finish ninth in points standings.

Vanderwal's 2018 season was highlighted by winning both K&N West races at Tucson in May.

In 2019, Vanderwal moved from Patriot Motorsports Group to Levin Racing, bringing the No. 43 with him. He qualified on the pole at Colorado, converting it into a second-place finish in the race. In total, Vanderwal ran each of the season's first seven races before transitioning his focus to weekly racing at Colorado and finding sponsorship for the 2020 season.

In 2020, Vanderwal joined Means Racing in the NASCAR Xfinity Series, running all but the first three races. He finished 30th in points with a best race finish of 19th at Pocono Raceway. Vanderwal did not return to the team in 2021 due to sponsorship issues.

Motorsports career results

NASCAR
(key) (Bold – Pole position awarded by qualifying time. Italics – Pole position earned by points standings or practice time. * – Most laps led.)

Xfinity Series

K&N Pro Series East

K&N Pro Series West

 Season still in progress
 Ineligible for series points

References

External links
 

2001 births
Living people
Racing drivers from Colorado
NASCAR drivers
People from Weld County, Colorado
ARCA Midwest Tour drivers